Herman S. "Hi" Bell (July 16, 1897 – June 7, 1949) was an American professional baseball pitcher. He played in Major League Baseball (MLB) for the St. Louis Cardinals and New York Giants. For his career, he compiled a 32–34 record in 221 appearances, most as a relief pitcher, with a 3.69 earned run average and 191 strikeouts.  Bell was a member of three National League pennant winners (1926, 1930 & 1933), winning two World Series with the 1926 Cardinals and the 1933 Giants.  In World Series play, he recorded no decisions in three appearances, with a 4.50 earned run average and 1 strikeout.  On July 19, 1924, Bell became the last pitcher in Major League history to start and win both ends of a double header.

Bell died from a coronary occlusion in 1949 at age 51 and is buried at Calvary Cemetery in Los Angeles.

See also
 List of Major League Baseball annual saves leaders

References

1897 births
1949 deaths
Major League Baseball pitchers
Baseball players from Kentucky
St. Louis Cardinals players
New York Giants (NL) players
Burials at Calvary Cemetery (Los Angeles)